This is a list of airports in Kosovo.



Airports 

Airport names shown in bold indicate the airport has scheduled service on commercial airlines.

See also 

 Transport in Kosovo
 List of airports by ICAO code: B#BK - Kosovo
 Wikipedia: WikiProject Aviation/Airline destination lists: Europe#Kosovo

References

Kosovo
 
Kosovo
Airports